Trevor A. Knight (born October 3, 1993) is a former American football quarterback. He played college football at Oklahoma and Texas A&M. After leading Oklahoma to an 8–5 record in the 2014 season, he lost the starting job in an open quarterback competition to Texas Tech transfer Baker Mayfield prior to the 2015 season. On January 4, 2016, it was announced that Knight would transfer to Texas A&M University.

Following his college career, Knight went undrafted in 2017 and was signed by the Arizona Cardinals. He later spent the 2017 season on the Atlanta Falcons practice squad before joining the Arizona Hotshots of the Alliance of American Football in 2018, until the league ceased operations in April 2019.

Early years
Knight attended Ronald Reagan High School in San Antonio, Texas. While at Ronald Reagan High School, he played for the football team. As a senior, he threw for 2,092 yards and 27 touchdowns with 943 rushing yards and 15 touchdowns. He was ranked as the sixth-best dual-threat quarterback recruit by the Rivals.com recruiting network. Trevor has a fraternal twin brother, Connor, who was a longsnapper/fullback for Oklahoma. They played alongside each other for Trevor's entire time with the Sooners; however, Connor elected to stay at OU when Trevor transferred to Texas A&M.

College career

Oklahoma

On February 1, 2012, Knight committed to the University of Oklahoma under head coach Bob Stoops.

Knight was redshirted for the 2012 season.

He was named the Sooners starting quarterback as a redshirt freshman in 2013.

He was named MVP of the 2014 Sugar Bowl when he helped lead Oklahoma to a 45–31 upset of two-time reigning national champion Alabama. Knight threw for 348 yards and four touchdowns in a record-setting performance.

He began the 2014 season against Louisiana Tech, completing 19 of 34 passes for 253 yards, one touchdown, and one interception. In addition, he had four rushes for 17 yards.

On December 11, 2015, it was announced that Knight had obtained a full release from his scholarship and would explore his options to transfer to another school. Despite his intentions to transfer, Knight indicated he would remain a member of the team at least until the completion of Oklahoma's 2015 season.

Texas A&M
On January 4, 2016, Knight announced he would be transferring to Texas A&M University. He graduated from Oklahoma in December 2015 and was eligible to play immediately at Texas A&M.

Knight made his Texas A&M debut on September 3, 2016, against UCLA, which Texas A&M won in overtime by a score of 31–24.

Knight was thought to be out for the year with a shoulder injury, but made a return on senior night against LSU. In the 54–39 loss to the Tigers, he was 14-of-30 for 211 yards and three touchdowns.

Statistics

Professional career
Knight received an invitation to the NFL Combine and completed all of the combine drills and positional drills. He finished first among all quarterbacks in the vertical jump, broad jump, and had a 40-yard dash time of 4.54. His time was also faster than some running backs including Tennessee's Alvin Kamara. His passing drills were described as mediocre and mildly inconsistent. To prepare for the combine, Knight worked out with Dallas Cowboys' quarterback Dak Prescott throughout the offseason, who was able to shed the idea of a limited dual-threat quarterback. After showcasing his physical ability at the combine, multiple teams approached him about the possibilities of converting to wide receiver or safety. He immediately dispelled those notions and claimed he wanted to stick to quarterback. On March 30, 2017, Knight participated at Texas A&M's pro day, along with Jermaine Eluemunor, Justin Evans, Myles Garrett, Daeshon Hall, Ricky Seals-Jones, Josh Reynolds, and seven others. Over 50 team representatives and scouts from the NFL attended as Knight was impressive throughout his passing drills. At the conclusion of the pre-draft process, he was projected to be a seventh round pick or a priority undrafted free agent. He was ranked the 15th best quarterback prospect by NFLDraftScout.com.

Arizona Cardinals
On April 29, 2017, the Arizona Cardinals signed Knight to a three-year, $1.66 million contract after he went undrafted in the 2017 NFL Draft. Throughout training camp, he competed with veteran Blaine Gabbert for the job as the third-string quarterback behind Carson Palmer and Drew Stanton. He was waived by the team on September 2, 2017, as a part of final roster cuts.

Atlanta Falcons 
On September 7, 2017, Knight was signed to the Atlanta Falcons' practice squad. Knight later underwent back surgery.

Arizona Hotshots
In November 2018, Knight was selected by the Arizona Hotshots with the sixth-overall pick of the 2019 AAF QB Draft.

Knight began the 2019 AAF season as the Hotshots' backup to John Wolford. In addition to his relief duties, Knight served as a jammer on special teams, lining up for the punt return unit. Due to the AAF ceasing operations 8 weeks into the inaugural season, Knight became a free agent.

Career statistics

References

External links

Oklahoma Sooners bio
Texas A&M Aggies bio

1993 births
Living people
Players of American football from San Antonio
American football quarterbacks
Oklahoma Sooners football players
Texas A&M Aggies football players
Arizona Cardinals players
Atlanta Falcons players
San Antonio Commanders players
Arizona Hotshots players